Frederick, Elector Palatine may refer to:

Frederick I, Elector Palatine (1425–1476)
Frederick II, Elector Palatine (1482–1556)
Frederick III, Elector Palatine (1515–1576)
Frederick IV, Elector Palatine (1574–1610)
Frederick V, Elector Palatine (1596–1632)